Thong ek, also known as "Wheat Flour Dumplings with Egg Yolks", is one of the nine auspicious traditional Thai desserts. It is a golden sweet carved as various types of flowers decorated with a piece of gold leaf on top, popularly served in very significant occasions such as career advancement ceremonies.

Etymology 
In Thai, the word Thong means "gold" and the word Ek means "prime". It is believed that when Thong Ek is used in auspicious rituals or as a gift to seniors, it will bring wealth and to superiority in work; to be number one in their field of work.

History 
Thong ek is in the same category as other egg-based sweets (i.e. thong yip, thong yot, foi thong, sangkhaya and mo kaeng). It was introduced by Japanese-Portuguese chef Maria Guyomar de Pinha in the reign of Narai during the Ayutthaya Kingdom. Its origin is a Portuguese sweet which has yolk and sugar as main ingredients. Maria Guyomar de Pinha had combined the Portuguese and Thai methods of preparing sweets, demonstrating the delicate process of cooking, starting from raw materials to the meticulous taste, color, smell, appearance and beautiful decoration, which varies according to the dessert itself.

Ingredients 
The dessert is made from the mixture of sugar, coconut milk and egg yolk which is pressed into wooden molds. The cooking process will not be finished until a little gold foil is decorated on the top of the sweet.

See also
 List of Thai desserts

References 

Thai desserts and snacks
Egg dishes